Matthew Gregory Vierling (born September 16, 1996) is an American professional baseball center fielder for the Detroit Tigers of Major League Baseball (MLB). He played college baseball at the University of Notre Dame. The Philadelphia Phillies selected Vierling in the fifth round of the 2018 Major League Baseball draft, and he made his MLB debut with them in 2021.

Early life 
Vierling was born in St. Louis Missouri. His father was a former college football player for the Kansas Jayhawks. Both Matt and his younger brother Mark were dedicated baseball players throughout their childhoods. They played for one season together in 2015 on the varsity team for Christian Brothers College High School in St. Louis where Matt led the Cadets to the Class 5 Missouri state high school baseball championship.  Matt, a senior, had been moved from his usual fielding position of outfielder  to shortstop, next to his brother at second base. That year, Vierling led Christian Brothers in most offensive metrics, batting .451 with three home runs, 32 runs batted in (RBIs), and 31 runs scored. He also had an 8–0 win–loss record as a pitcher, with a 2.07 earned run average (ERA).

College career 

Vierling was selected in the 30th round of the 2015 Major League Baseball draft by his hometown St. Louis Cardinals, but did not sign with the team and honored his commitment to the Notre Dame Fighting Irish.

Vierling attended the University of Notre Dame, and played college baseball for the Notre Dame Fighting Irish for three seasons. As a sophomore, he batted .330 with seven home runs and 42 RBIs and was named third team All-Atlantic Coast Conference (ACC). After his sophomore year, he played for the Harwich Mariners of the Cape Cod Baseball League, where he batted .182. Vierling was named second team All-ACC as a junior after hitting for a .310 average with 10 home runs and 43 RBIs.

Professional career

Philadelphia Phillies

Minor leagues 
The Philadelphia Phillies selected Vierling in the fifth round of the 2018 Major League Baseball draft. After signing with the team, he was assigned to the short-season Williamsport Crosscutters. Vierling batted .420 in 12 games and was then promoted to the Class A Lakewood Blue Claws. He spent the 2019 season with the Clearwater Threshers of the Class A-Advanced Florida State League. Vierling did not play in a game in 2020 due to the cancellation of the minor league season because of the COVID-19 pandemic.

After starting the 2021 season at the Phillies' alternate training site, Vierling was assigned to the Double-A Reading Fightin Phils to begin the minor league season. He was promoted to the Class AAA Lehigh Valley IronPigs after hitting .345 with 6 home runs and 16 RBIs in 24 games with Reading.

Major leagues (2021–2022) 

On June 19, 2021, Vierling was selected to the 40-man roster and promoted to the major leagues for the first time. He made his Major League debut that day as a pinch hitter, hitting a single to right field in his first at-bat off of San Francisco Giants reliever Jarlin García while also stealing second base and scoring a run. He hit his first Major League home run on September 25, 2021, in Philadelphia in a 3–0 win over the Pittsburgh Pirates. In 2021, he had the fastest sprint speed of all major league first basemen, at 29.2 feet/second.

On June 7, 2022, he was recalled to the Phillies from AAA affiliate, Lehigh Valley Iron Pigs, and hit the game-winning home run off of Josh Hader. Vierling's first multi home run game was on June 17, 2022, against the Washington Nationals. On September 21, 2022, Vierling went 5-for-5, including his first walk-off hit in the 10th inning, in a 4-3 win against the Toronto Blue Jays.

In the 2022 regular season he batted .246/.297/.351 in 325 at bats, with six home runs, 32 RBIs, and seven steals. He had the fastest sprint speed of all Phillies players, at 29.6 feet/second. He played 61 games in center field, 37 in right field, 30 in left field, four at second base, and two at first base. As a center fielder, he set up further away from home plate than any other major leaguer, at a depth of 332 feet.

Detroit Tigers 
On January 7, 2023, the Phillies traded Vierling, infielder Nick Maton, and catcher Donny Sands to the Detroit Tigers for pitcher Gregory Soto and infielder Kody Clemens.

References

External links

Notre Dame Fighting Irish bio

1996 births
Living people
Baseball players from St. Louis
Major League Baseball outfielders
Philadelphia Phillies players
Notre Dame Fighting Irish baseball players
Harwich Mariners players
Williamsport Crosscutters players
Lakewood BlueClaws players
Clearwater Threshers players
Reading Fightin Phils players
Lehigh Valley IronPigs players